Chrysotus pallipes is a species in the family Dolichopodidae ("longlegged flies"), in the order Diptera ("flies").

References

Further reading

External links

Diaphorinae
Insects described in 1861
Taxa named by Hermann Loew